Zeynalabad-e Damdari Salman (also Romanized as Zeynalābād-e Dāmdārī Salmān; also known as Zeynalābād) is a village in Mahan Rural District, Mahan District, Kerman County, Kerman Province, Iran. At the 2006 census, its population was 36, in 7 families.

References 

Populated places in Kerman County